Abernethy Flats is a gravel plain cut by braided streams at the head of Brandy Bay, James Ross Island. Named by United Kingdom Antarctic Place-Names Committee (UK-APC) in 1983 after Thomas Abernethy, gunner on HMS Erebus during exploration of these waters in 1842–43.

Plains of Antarctica
Landforms of James Ross Island
Landforms of Graham Land